Santi Faustino e Giovita may refer to:

 Santi Faustino e Giovita, Brescia, a Roman Catholic church in Brescia, Italy 
 Santi Faustino e Giovita, Chiari, a Roman Catholic church in Brescia, Italy 
 Santi Faustino e Giovita, Montefiorino, a Roman Catholic church in Brescia, Italy 
 Santi Faustino e Giovita, Rubiera, a Roman Catholic church in Brescia, Italy

See also 

 Faustinus and Jovita